Feng Xuemin (born 1953) is a Chinese photographer. He has lived in Japan since 1985.

Born in Shanghai, he traveled to Japan in 1985 as a sponsored researcher for the Chinese News & Publication Association, and has held exhibitions throughout Japan, China, the United States, Canada and France. In August 2007, he exhibited work in New York as part of a United Nations exhibition.

In 1999, he was the first non-Japanese to receive a Taiyō Award. He won the gold prize at the World Chinese Art Exhibition in 2000.

References

1953 births
Chinese photographers
Living people
Artists from Shanghai
Date of birth missing (living people)